Laura (minor planet designation: 467 Laura) (1901 FY) is Main-belt asteroid discovered on 9 January 1901 by Max Wolf at Heidelberg. The semi-major axis of the orbit of 467 Laura lies just inside the 7/3 Kirkwood gap, located at 2.95 AU. It's named after the character Laura from Amilcare Ponchielli's opera La Gioconda.

References

External links 
 
 

000467
Discoveries by Max Wolf
Named minor planets
19010109